My Mate Dick is an autobiographical 1962 book by Ion Idriess. It was based on his prospecting days and focuses on his adventures in Cape York Peninsula with his best friend the prospector-explorer, Dick Welsh.

Idriess had previously dedicated The Opium Smugglers to Welsh.

References

External links
My Mate Dick at AustLit

1962 non-fiction books
Books by Ion Idriess
Far North Queensland
Australian autobiographies